Kishanpur Baral is a village in Baghpat district, Uttar Pradesh, India. Kishanpur Baral is situated on the Delhi-Saharanpur Yamunotri Highway. This village is about 60 km from the New Delhi and also 60 km from Meerut. It is about 30 km from Bagpat.

Economy
The village is mainly agriculture based. Sugarcane is the main commercial crop.

Education
Education has been compulsory in this village since the time of the British administration. There are many schools and colleges. DAV Inter College is the oldest one.

References

Villages in Bagpat district